RevFM is a network of Christian radio stations in Pennsylvania, broadcasting contemporary Christian music and Christian adult contemporary.

RevFM is currently heard on five full powered stations and a few low powered translators.

Stations

Notes:

References

External links
 

Contemporary Christian radio stations in the United States
American radio networks
Radio stations in Pennsylvania